Rehizg (also Romanized as Rehīzg, Rahezg, Rahīzag, and Rahīzak; also known as Rahzang and Razag Khoosaf) is a village in Naharjan Rural District, Mud District, Sarbisheh County, South Khorasan Province, Iran. At the 2006 census, its population was 16, in 7 families.

References 

Populated places in Sarbisheh County